The St. Louis Cardinals 1989 season was the team's 108th season in St. Louis, Missouri and the 98th season in the National League.  The Cardinals went 86-76 during the season and finished 3rd in the National League East division.

Shortstop Ozzie Smith and third baseman Terry Pendleton won Gold Gloves this year.

On September 29, team owner August A. Busch, Jr. died at the age of 90.

Offseason
 October 4, 1988: Lee Tunnell was released by the Cardinals.
 December 16, 1988: Steve Lake and Curt Ford were traded by the Cardinals to the Philadelphia Phillies for Milt Thompson.

Regular season
The over-achieving 1989 Cardinal team almost made the playoffs. Pedro Guerrero finished third in the National League MVP voting while leading the league with 42 doubles and finishing second in RBIs (117).  Joe Magrane won 18 games while José DeLeón won 16 games.  Milt Thompson played in 155 games and hit .290, mostly substituting for the injured Willie McGee.  Vince Coleman lead the league in stolen bases for the fifth straight year. However, it would be the arch-rival Cubs who would claim the division and move on to the playoffs.  This team featured three former college football punters -- Vince Coleman, Cris Carpenter, and Matt Kinzer who played one game for the Detroit Lions.

Opening Day starters
Tom Brunansky
Vince Coleman
Pedro Guerrero
Tim Jones
Joe Magrane
José Oquendo
Tony Peña
Terry Pendleton
Milt Thompson

Season standings

Record vs. opponents

Notable transactions
 April 24, 1989: Jeremy Hernandez was traded by the Cardinals to the San Diego Padres for Randy Byers.

Roster

Player stats

Batting

Starters by position
Note: Pos = Position; G = Games played; AB = At bats; H = Hits; Avg. = Batting average; HR = Home runs; RBI = Runs batted in

Other batters
Note: G = Games played; AB = At bats; H = Hits; Avg. = Batting average; HR = Home runs; RBI = Runs batted in

Pitching

Starting pitchers
Note: G = Games pitched; IP = Innings pitched; W = Wins; L = Losses; ERA = Earned run average; SO = Strikeouts

Other pitchers
Note: G = Games pitched; IP = Innings pitched; W = Wins; L = Losses; ERA = Earned run average; SO = Strikeouts

Relief pitchers
Note: G = Games pitched; W = Wins; L = Losses; SV = Saves; ERA = Earned run average; SO = Strikeouts

Awards and honors
 Vince Coleman, National League Stolen Base Leader, 65
 Terry Pendleton, Third Base, National League Gold Glove
 Ozzie Smith, Shortstop, National League Gold Glove

Farm system 

LEAGUE CHAMPIONS: Arkansas

References

External links
1989 St. Louis Cardinals at Baseball Reference
1989 St. Louis Cardinals team page at www.baseball-almanac.com

St. Louis Cardinals seasons
St. Louis Cardinals season
St Louis